María Guadalupe Sánchez is the name of:

María Guadalupe Sánchez Santiago (born 1951), Mexican politician
María Guadalupe Sánchez (racewalker, born 1977), Mexican racewalker
María Guadalupe Sánchez (racewalker, born 1995), Mexican racewalker